Vardim Island (ostrov Vardim) is the third largest Bulgarian Danubian island (after Belene Island and Kozloduy Island). Located east of the town of Svishtov, opposite the village of Vardim (in Svishtov municipality, Veliko Tarnovo Province) and part of the Belene Danubian Archipelago, it is a protected wetland and bird nesting area of national importance.

An inlet-type forest often forms when a part of the island is flooded during the spring high water.

Vardim Rocks at Hell Gates in Livingston Island, South Shetland Islands in Antarctica are named after Vardim Island and the adjacent settlement of Vardim.

Biodiversity
Besides the Vardim oak, a specific hygrophile type of summer oak, other types of oak and elm can be observed on Vardim Island, as well as the white willow, white poplar, black acacia, black poplar, snowflake, etc.

According to the Bulgarian Society for the Protection of Birds, the island is one of the five most important nesting areas in the country for the great cormorant, the black-crowned night heron and the common spoonbill, making it a site of international ornithological importance. A total of 21 nationally protected species nidificate on the island. Of the 75 bird species that can be observed on Vardim Island, 31 are of European importance: 2 fall into category SPEC1, 11 in SPEC2 and 18 in SPEC3. The sea eagle can be seen on the island, and until 1985 other species to be observed on it included the squacco heron, glossy ibis and pygmy cormorant.

The Old Oak

In order to protect the natural Vardim oak plantations and the large number of waders, The Old Oak area was proclaimed a natural reserve on 5 March 1971 by the Ministry of Forests and Forest Industry. The reserve spreads over an area of 0.718 km2, of which 0.646 afforested and 0.072 unforested. On 2 July 1998 it was recategorized as a protected area with an area of 0.987 km2 by the Committee for the Preservation of the Environment with the Council of Ministers of Bulgaria.

References

General references

Notes

External links
 Map including the island at the Bulgarian Society for the Protection of Birds website 

River islands of Bulgaria
Landforms of Veliko Tarnovo Province
Islands of the Danube
Svishtov
Protected areas of Bulgaria